Halvar Hansen (born 4 August 1947) is a Norwegian politician for the Labour Party.

He served as a deputy representative to the Norwegian Parliament from Troms during the term 1981–1985.

On the local level Hansen was the mayor of Harstad municipality from 2003 to 2007.

References

1947 births
Living people
Deputy members of the Storting
Labour Party (Norway) politicians
Mayors of Harstad
People from Harstad
Place of birth missing (living people)